Gorenje Dole is a settlement in the Municipality of Škocjan in southeastern Slovenia. Within the municipality, it belongs to the Village Community of Dole. The area is part of the historical region of Lower Carniola. The municipality is now included in the Southeast Slovenia Statistical Region. 

The local church in the village is dedicated to the Holy Cross and belongs to the Parish of Škocjan. It was first mentioned in written documents dating to 1526. It was restyled in the Baroque in the 18th century.

References

External links
Gorenje Dole at Geopedia

Populated places in the Municipality of Škocjan